Stanley Lynn "Stan" Deno (died October 12, 2016) was an American educational psychologist and professor of educational psychology at the University of Minnesota, where he was also the director of the Special Education Program.

References

External links
Obituary in the Minneapolis Star-Tribune
Memorial page at the University of Minnesota's website

2016 deaths
Educational psychologists
University of Minnesota faculty
St. Olaf College alumni
Scientists from Minneapolis
University of Delaware faculty
University of Minnesota College of Education and Human Development alumni
Roosevelt High School (Minnesota) alumni